Neutron backscattering is one of several inelastic neutron scattering techniques. Backscattering from monochromator and analyzer crystals is used to achieve an energy resolution in the order of μeV. Neutron backscattering experiments are performed to study atomic or molecular motion on a nanosecond time scale.

History 

Neutron backscattering was proposed by Heinz Maier-Leibnitz in 1966, and realized by some of his students in a test setup at the research reactor FRM I in Garching bei München, Germany. Following this successful demonstration of principle, permanent spectrometers were built at Forschungszentrum Jülich and at the Institut Laue-Langevin (ILL). Later instruments brought an extension of the accessible momentum transfer range (IN13 at ILL), the introduction of focussing optics (IN16 at ILL), and a further increase of intensity by a compact design with a phase-space transform chopper (HFBS at NIST, SPHERES at FRM II, IN16B at the Institut Laue-Langevin).

Backscattering spectrometers 
Operational backscattering spectrometers at reactors include IN10, IN13, and IN16B at the Institut Laue-Langevin, the High Flux Backscattering Spectrometer (HFBS) at the NIST Center for Neutron Research, 
the SPHERES] instrument of Forschungszentrum Jülich at FRM II
and EMU at ANSTO.

Inverse geometry spectrometers
Inverse geometry spectrometers at spallation sources include IRIS and OSIRIS at the ISIS neutron source at Rutherford-Appleton, BASIS at the Spallation Neutron Source, and MARS at the Paul Scherrer Institute

Historic instruments
Historic instruments are the first backscattering spectrometer that was a temporary setup at FRM I 
and the backscattering spectrometer BSS (also called PI) at the DIDO reactor of the Forschungszentrum Jülich (decommissioned).

References 

Neutron scattering
Spectroscopy